DD Chennai, formerly known as DD Madras, is a state-owned television channel telecasting from Doordarshan Kendra, Chennai.

History

Doordarshan Kendra Chennai was inaugurated on 15 August 1975. The service had been extended to the entire state in phased manner by installing Terrestrial Transmitters of different capacities (HPTs, LPTs, VLPTs) at different parts of the state. Only one channel with limited time for regional language, that is, Tamil was telecasted, the duration of the entire telecast was not for 24 hours. During 1985, colour transmission was started; in 1988 a second channel was started. Meanwhile, in 1986 Tamil serials were telecasted for the first time. DD Chennai is one of the oldest kendras in the country, having been begun in the mid-1970s.

In addition to the Terrestrial transmission, Chennai programmes were beamed through satellite and cable networks. The channel is owned and operated by Doordarshan, a television network of Prasar Bharati Broadcasting Corporation and is based in Chennai. Prasar Bharati is an autonomous corporation of the Government of India's Ministry of Information and Broadcasting and comprises Doordarshan television network and All India Radio.

The early years
The channel began broadcast on an experimental basis on 15 August 1975 from a makeshift studio at Chennai Doordarshan Kendra in Chennai as part of All India Radio. It started with 20 TV receivers in and around Chennai and transmitted one-hour educational and developmental programs twice a week. Regular daily transmission started in 1975.

In 1976, the Indian government constituted Doordarshan, the public television broadcaster, as a separate department under the Ministry of Information and Broadcasting. Doordarshan Kendra Chennai has transformed from the initial setup of television base production center during 1975.

Television Base Production Center was established for SITE (Satellite Instructional Television Experiment) Project conducted from 1975 to 1976. This Experiment was envisaged by Govt. of India to Educate rural population by producing and telecasting area-specific programmes on the subjects ranging from agriculture, animal husbandry, health and nutrition, and adult education through satellite. Based on research villages had been selected to install DR Sets (Direct Reception Sets) viewing telecasts. This experiment was conducted Tamil Nadu and five other states.

These programmes were telecast through "ATS – 6" Satellite borrowed from the United States's National Aeronautics and Space Administration (NASA). On successful completion of SITE Project, these programmes were continued as INSAT project and was telecast through India's own Satellite INSAT. In addition to the terrestrial transmission, Chennai programmes were beamed through satellite and cable networks.

DD National, DD Podhigai and Narrow cast
DD Chennai has a three-tier programme service

National (DD National): The emphasis in the programmes in the National service is on events and issues of interest to the entire nation.
Regional (Podhigai TV): Programmes in the regional service focus on events and issues of interest to the people of that particular state.
Local (Narrow cast): The local (DD Coimbatore, DD Madurai, DD Pudhucherry) service caters to the needs of the populace living in the areas falling within the reach of a particular transmitter through area specific programmes in the local languages and dialects.

In addition, the programmes in the national and regional services are also available in satellite mode to the viewers all over the country.

DD Chennai is the only regional language terrestrial channel, that has sixteen hours Program from 11 p.m. to 3 p.m. link to Delhi DD National. In the terrestrial mode, that has eight hours Program from 3 p.m. to 11 p.m., has DD Podhigai. DD Chennai reaches 94 percent of the population of Tamil Nadu. The channel originates its programmes in Chennai.

DD Chennai was launched on 15 August 1975 and the network features some original programming, such as dramas, comedy-series, talk shows, documentaries, and some times re-runs of popular TV shows from other Tamil television channels. In addition, the channel also shows dubbed programs from other Indian languages, such as Urdu, Punjabi, Tamil, and so forth.

Program sourcing

Programmes for different channels of DD Chennai are sourced from:

In-house production: Programmes produced by DD Chennai professionals utilizing Doordarshan infrastructure, including coverage of events 'live' by DD Chennai .
Commissioned programmes: Programmes produced by persons of proven merit with funds provided by DD Chennai.
Sponsored programmes: Privately produced programmes telecast by DD Chennai on payment of a fee in exchange for Free Commercial Time.
Royalty programmes: Programmes acquired by DD Chennai from outside producers on payment of royalty for single or multiple telecasts.
Acquired Programmes: Programmes/events acquired from foreign companies on payment of rights fee.
Educational/Development programmes: Educational and Development programmes produced by different agencies of the Government.
Self-financed commissioning: The initial production cost of these programmes is met by the private producer. DD Chennai reimburses the production cost to the producer after commencement of telecast. The programme is marketed by DD Chennai. The scheme also has provisions for payment of bonus on approved production cost on attainment of high TRPs, and for reduction of production cost in case of poor performance of programme.
Narrowcasting of Agricultural Programmes through LPTs: The TNAU in collaboration with Doordarshan Kendra, Chennai has recently started the "Narrow casting of agricultural programmes through LPT" for the benefit of farmers and the general public in and around Coimbatore district.
To focus on Tamil literature and folklore: DD Chennai is concentrating on Tamil folklore and literature. DD Chennai have started work in this regard. DD Chennai would broadcast programmes relating to the history of Tamil, make serials of Tamil novels, and televise short stories of contemporary writers.

Programming coverage

DD Chennai TV's Transmitters

Transmitters at various locations in Tamil Nadu
Tamil Nadu
HPTs - 9,  Power - 10, K.W  Range - 70 km 
 Chennai
 Dharmapuri
 Kodaikanal
 Kumbakonam
 Rameshwaram
 Chennai (DD News)
 Kodaikanal (DD News)
 Chennai (Podhigai channel),
 Chennai (Digital)

LPT - 54,100 W  Range 15 km Ambasamudram, Ambur, Arani, Arcot, Attur, Cheyyar, Chidambaram, Coimbatore, Coonoor, Courtalam, Cuddalore, Denkanikotta, Erode, Gudiyatam, Kallakuruchi, Krishnagiri, Marthandam, Mayuram, Nagapattinam, Nagarcoil, Nattan, Neyveli, Palani, Pattukottai, Peranampet, Pollachi, Pudukkottai, Rajapalayam, Salem, Shankaran Kovil, Thanjavur, Thiruvaiyaru, Tindivanam, Tiruchendur, Tiruchirapalli, Tiruneiveli, Tirupattur, Tiruvannamalai, Tuticorin, Udagamandalam, Udumalpet, Vandavasi, Vaniyambadi, Vellore, Villupuram.

UHF)  20 K.W Range 70 km Coimbatore (DD News), Erode (DD News), Madurai (DD News), Salem (DD News), Tiruchirapalli (DD News), Tirunelveli (DD News), Tirupattur (DD News), Tuticorin (DD News), Vellore (DD News)

VLPT - 7	Gingee, Kanchipuram, Mettupalayam, Tiruvanamalai, Valliur, Valparai, Vaza Padi
XSER - 1	Dindigul

Pondicherry
HPT - 1	Pondicherry (int)
LPT - 3	Karaikal, Pondicherry, Pondicherry (DD News)
VLPT - 2	Mahe, Yanam

DD sister channels

Technology
The country's largest public broadcaster, Doordarshan Kendra Chennai was under the process of modernization during the forthcoming commonwealth games, DD would relay its signals on latest technology of High Definition. Process of establishing four Regional DD studios including, DD Delhi, DD Mumbai, DD Kolkata and DD Chennai is ongoing. The high-definition studios would help to relay digital signal to all the viewers of DD as it would drastically improve the quality of picture and sound of the channel.

Process of digitalization of the transmission system was already under process and it was expected that in the years to come the process would be completed, DD adding that for the modernization of the DD, new equipments were being purchased.

Criticisms

Citiations of bias 
Doorsharshan does not have an independent editorial control unlike the BBC. Prasar Bharathi, its parent body has all board members appointed by the Government of India acting through the Information and Broadcasting Ministry. This control is evident in a budget that allows expenditure on "propaganda and public relations".
It has been actively used especially during the Emergency for government propaganda.
In 2004, it censored the airing of a controversial documentary on Jayaprakash Narayan, one of the opposition leaders during the Emergency.
DD National broadcasts a programme 'Pakistan Reporter' which reports on the events in Pakistan with an active propaganda tilt. The introduction voice over proclaims that Pakistan has enough to worry about and goes on to portray Pakistan as unstable.
It has in association with All India Radio established high power transmitters along the India-Pakistan Border to counter Pakistani propaganda with its own.
During Operation Bluestar, only government sources were used for reporting the story. Here Doordarshan was complicit in the production of a video that claimed acts of violence which when investigated by independent journalists were found to be false.
Sporadic efforts to boost regional Kendra channels like DD Chennai's programming fare over the last year or two have floundered. Currently its transmission is bad, its programming is uninspiring, and its packaging of the channel's regional fare pretty dismal. Serial makers cannot get sponsors, because the kind of viewership the regional Kendra has does not get advertisers. Hindustan Lever, the biggest advertiser on television, is slowly deserting both the satellite and terrestrial Tamil programmes on DD.

See also
 Media in Chennai
 List of programs broadcast by DD National
 All India Radio
 Ministry of Information and Broadcasting
 DD Direct Plus
 List of South Asian television channels by country

References 
1."India's largest terrestrial network". Associated Press. Retrieved on 22 July 2007.

External links 

 
 Doordarshan Official Internet site
 Doordarshan news site
 An article at PFC

Television stations in Chennai
Foreign television channels broadcasting in the United Kingdom
Television channels and stations established in 1975
Direct broadcast satellite services
Indian direct broadcast satellite services
Doordarshan
1975 establishments in Tamil Nadu